Victor Frank Ridder (April 4, 1886 – June 14, 1963) was a newspaper publisher and civic leader in New York City for many decades in the early 20th century.  Victor and his brothers Bernard H. Ridder and Joseph E. Ridder were the owners and publishers of the New Yorker Staats-Zeitung, the premier daily newspaper of German-speaking residents of the New York City area, which they had inherited from their father Herman Ridder.

Victor Ridder was active in the Boy Scouts of America as a volunteer leader in New York City for many years.  In 1912, he helped organize New York's first Catholic parish troop, and within a couple of years became a National BSA volunteer with responsibility for promoting Catholic Scouting.  He was a co-founder in 1922 of the National Catholic Committee on Scouting, and was later recognized by the National Council BSA for his distinguished service to youth with the Silver Buffalo Award. He served as president of the New York State Board of Social Welfare from 1929 to 1939, and as New York City administrator of the Works Progress Administration from October 1935 until his resignation in July 1936 (effective August 1.).

Ridder was survived by sons Walter Thompson Ridder (1917-1990), Robert Ridder (1919-2000), daughters Joan Ridder Challinor (1927-2018), Gretchen Ridder Nicholas (1915-), Esther Margaret Ridder (1925-2014), and second wife Ruth O'Day Ridder (1886-1969). Ridder was predeceased by daughter Mary Hartmann Ridder (1912-1960) and first wife Marie Thompson Ridder (1885-1935).

His company, founded by his father, Ridder Publications, Inc., later merged with Knight Newspapers, Inc. in 1974, and operated under the name Knight Ridder until 2006, when the company was purchased by The McClatchy Company.

References

1886 births
1963 deaths
20th-century American newspaper publishers (people)
American Roman Catholics
Commanders Crosses of the Order of Merit of the Federal Republic of Germany
Ridder family